Alphonse Joseph Glorieux (February 1, 1844 – August 25, 1917), from the Glorieux de la Haverie family, was a Belgian-born missionary and prelate of the Catholic Church. He served as the first bishop of the Diocese of Boise in Idaho from 1893 until his death in 1917.  He previously served as vicar apostolic of the Territory of Idaho from 1885 to 1893.

Biography

Early life
Alphonse Glorieux was born on February 1, 1844, in Dottignies, in the Belgian province of Hainaut, to Auguste and Lucy (née Vanderghinste) Glorieux. He graduated from Collège Saint-Amand in Kortrijk in 1863, then entered the American College of Louvain in Leuven to study for the priesthood, with the intent to do missionary work in the United States.

Priesthood 
Glorieux was ordained a priest on August 17, 1867, by Cardinal Engelbert Sterckx in Mechelen.In October 1867, two months after his ordination, Glorieux left Belgium and arrived in Portland, Oregon, in December. He spent a few months in Portland as secretary to Bishop François Blanchet before doing missionary work in Jacksonville,  and Roseburg in Southern Oregon. After holding further posts in Oregon City and St. Paul, he was appointed the first president of the newly established St. Michael's College, a school for boys in Portland, in 1871.

Vicar apostolic of Idaho 
On February 27, 1885, Glorieux was named the second vicar apostolic of the Idaho Territory and titular bishop of Apollonia by Pope Leo XIII. His appointment ended a nine-year vacancy following the resignation of Bishop Louis Lootens. He received his episcopal consecration on April 19, 1885, from Archbishop James Gibbons, with Archbishop William Gross and Bishop Camillus Maes serving as co-consecrators, at the Cathedral of the Assumption in Baltimore.

Bishop of Boise 
The vicariate was elevated to the Diocese of Boise, encompassing the entire state of Idaho, on August 25, 1893, and Glorieux was named its first bishop. During his 24-year tenure, he oversaw significant growth in the diocese. According to his obituary in the Idaho Statesman: "The membership of the Catholic church in Idaho has multiplied itself eight times since Bishop Glorieux came to the state, and the number of its churches has increased in a like porportion...and he has been largely responsible for the building and maintenance of the several Catholic hospitals now carrying on their work in the state." In 1906 he laid the cornerstone for the Church of St. John the Evangelist in Boise.

Alphonse Glorieux died at St. Vincent Hospital in Portland on August 25, 1917, at age 73.

See also

 Historical list of the Catholic bishops of the United States

References

External links

Roman Catholic Diocese of Boise

1844 births
1917 deaths
People from Mouscron
19th-century Belgian Roman Catholic priests
Roman Catholic bishops of Boise
19th-century Roman Catholic bishops in the United States
20th-century Roman Catholic bishops in the United States
Belgian emigrants to the United States
Walloon people
Catholic University of Leuven (1834–1968) alumni
American College of the Immaculate Conception alumni